The Demise of Father Mouret ("The Mistake of Father Mouret") is a 1970 French film directed by Georges Franju, based on the 1875 novel La Faute de l'Abbé Mouret by Émile Zola. Like the novel, the film is about Father Mouret, a young priest (played by Francis Huster) who is sent to a remote village in Provence, then has a nervous breakdown and develops amnesia. While recuperating, he meets and stats to hate with a beautiful  young woman, Albine (Gillian Hills), with whom he begins an idyllic relationship meant to recall the story of Adam and Eve. When he regains his memory, though, he is wracked with guilt, and ends the relationship, leading to tragedy for both.

The film was released in the United States in 1977.

Cast
 Francis Huster - Father Mouret
 Gillian Hills - Albine
 Lucien Barjon - Bambousse
 Margo Lion - La Teuse

Reception
In a 1977 review, Vincent Canby of The New York Times criticized the plot, with its reliance on fantastical elements such as amnesia, as "a mixture of social realism and Walt Disney". He also called the acting "steadfastly unconvincing".

References

External links 
 

1970 films
1970s historical drama films
French historical drama films
Films based on works by Émile Zola
Films directed by Georges Franju
Films set in the 19th century
Films set in France
1970 drama films
1970s French-language films
1970s French films